Hajo Holborn (18 May 1902, Berlin – 20 June 1969, Bonn) was a German-American historian and specialist in modern German history.

Early life 
Hajo Holborn was born the son of Ludwig Holborn, the German physicist and "Direktor der Physikalisch-Technischen Reichsanstalt," and became a student of Friedrich Meinecke at Berlin University, where he achieved a doctor of philosophy in 1924. After establishing at Heidelberg in 1926 as lecturer in medieval and modern history, he became Privatdozent there until he was called back to Berlin as Carnegie Professor of History and International Relationships at the private Deutsche Hochschule für Politik. He was dismissed from his appointments in 1933 by the Nazi government, but he had already left the country.

Emigration
Unwilling to participate in National Socialism, that same year he fled to the United Kingdom, then emigrated to the United States in 1934. Shortly after coming to America, he was appointed visiting professor of German history at Yale. 

He taught Diplomatic History at Tufts University, Massachusetts, (1936–1942) and was a guest professor at the University of Vienna, Austria (1955). He became a U.S. citizen and during the Second World War he worked for the Office of Strategic Services as special assistant to the chief of its Research and Analysis Branch, William L. Langer.

Postwar
After the war, he served as Randolph W. Townsend Professor at Yale until 1959, when he was awarded the title of Sterling Professor of History at Yale University; here he continued to teach and write until his death in 1969.

In 1967, Holborn became the second president of the American Historical Association not born in the United States (after Mikhail Rostovtzeff). Several specialists of German and European history in America, including Peter Gay, were students of Holborn.

Family 
Hajo Holborn married Annemarie Bettmann. Their son, Fred Holborn (born 1928), was a senior adjunct professor of American Foreign Policy at the School of Advanced International Studies at Johns Hopkins University before his death in 2005.  

Their daughter, Hanna Holborn Gray (born 1930), is a historian of political thought in the Renaissance and Reformation.  She is the Harry Pratt Judson Professor Emeritus at the University of Chicago and was the University's President for 15 years.

Work

Prior to his emigration, Holborn was commissioned by the government to compose a history of the constitution of the Weimar Republic, resulting in the work The Weimar Republic and the Birth of the German Democratic Party: The Hajo Holborn Papers, 1849–1956.

Other works by Holborn include the History of Modern Germany series, spanning three volumes and covering a four-century period from the Reformation and culminating in the capitulation of Hitler's regime in 1945. Holborn's work has been praised by peers, including Fritz Stern.

References

External links 

 Hajo Holborn papers (MS 579). Manuscripts and Archives, Yale University Library. 

1902 births
1969 deaths
German emigrants to the United States
20th-century German historians
Historians of Nazism
Presidents of the American Historical Association
20th-century American historians
German male non-fiction writers
Yale University faculty
Yale Sterling Professors
20th-century American male writers
American male non-fiction writers
20th-century German male writers
Academic staff of the Deutsche Hochschule für Politik